The Kaman SH-2G Super Seasprite is an American ship-based helicopter with anti-submarine, anti-surface threat capability, including over-the-horizon targeting. This aircraft extends and increases shipboard sensor and weapon capabilities against several types of enemy threats, including submarines of all types, surface ships, and patrol craft that may be armed with anti-ship missiles. It was originally developed for the United States Navy in the 1980s as a reengined version of the older Kaman SH-2 Seasprite.

The SH-2G's primary missions include anti-submarine and anti-surface warfare, anti-ship missile defense, and anti-ship surveillance and targeting. Secondary missions may include medical evacuation, search and rescue, personnel and cargo transfer, as well as small boat interdiction, amphibious assault air support, gun fire spotting, mine detection and battle damage assessment.

Design and development

In 1985, the SH-2G program was started. The US Navy wanted better anti-submarine capabilities and felt upgrading current helicopters would be a more cost-effective approach; moreover legacy Knox-class and early "short-hull" Perry-class frigates operating the SH-2F could not operate the larger SH-60B Seahawk. The prototype YSH-2G first flew on 2 April 1985. The prototype was a modified SH-2F fitted with two more powerful General Electric T700-GE-401/401C engines.

The G-model has a reinforced upper fuselage to support the heavier new engines. The SH-2G also has multifunctional displays and new avionic systems. The Navy began receiving Airborne Mine Counter Measures (AMCM) hardware with the Kaman Magic Lantern laser mine detection system in December 1996.

The US Navy's final production order of the SH-2F was in Fiscal Year 1986 with the last six orders switched to the SH-2G variant.

Operational history

Australia

In the 1990s, the Royal Australian Navy (RAN) decided that it needed an intermediate helicopter to operate from thes and the planned offshore patrol vessel (OPV), a proposed cooperative project with Malaysia; however, due to its size, the OPV could operate only a small helicopter. In 1997, the Australian Government signed a A$667 million contract with Kaman to purchase 11 upgraded Super Seasprites. By 2005, up to 40 deficiencies in the helicopter had been identified, including the inability to operate in bad weather and low-light conditions, and its failure to meet Australian airworthiness standards. The helicopters were initially restricted to transport duties during good weather before being grounded in May 2006. By early 2007, ten Super Seasprites had been delivered to 805 Squadron.

In February 2007, The Australian announced that the Seasprite project was "almost certain to be scrapped". At this point, the project was six years over schedule and its cost had grown to A$1.1 billion, with an additional A$45 million forecast as required for further upgrades. If approved the squadron would still not reach operational status until 2010. The sale or scrapping of the fleet was under consideration, possible replacements included the NHIndustries NH90 or further orders of Sikorsky SH-60 Seahawks. On 25 May 2007, The Age reported the government would continue to support the Seasprite; Defence Minister Brendan Nelson commented that progress on the project was being closely monitored.

Following the election of the new Labor government, The Australian reported on 31 January 2008 that the SH-2G(A) program was likely to be canceled due to cost overruns; additionally it was still not operational despite the original contract being signed in 1997. The same article also noted that Sikorsky had submitted an offer of several 'off the shelf' helicopters to replace Australia's SH-2G(A)s. On 5 March 2008, the project was canceled by the government; Kaman noted the project's end "on mutually agreed terms". Opposition parties also supported the decision to cancel. The remaining aircraft were returned to Kaman. Following the cancellation of the Super Seasprite, S-70 Seahawks from 816 Squadron were assigned to the Anzac-class frigates.

Egypt
In 1995, Egypt signed a contract for 10 SH-2Gs for use by the Egyptian Navy. These helicopters had been equipped for anti-submarine duties and to be deployed on the Navy's ships as required; the procurement included AQS-18A dipping sonar, search radars, and an electronic support suite. They are often operated alongside Egypt's fleet of Westland Sea Kings.

New Zealand

The Royal New Zealand Navy (RNZN) replaced its Westland Wasps with four interim SH-2F Seasprites (ex-US Navy), to operate with Anzac-class frigates until the fleet of five new SH-2G Super Seasprites were delivered. The Navy air element was transferred to No. 6 Squadron RNZAF at RNZAF Base Auckland in Whenuapai in October 2005. RNZN Seasprites have seen service in East Timor.

New Zealand purchased five SH-2Gs at the same time as Australia. However, New Zealand opted for new-build airframes that were outfitted with different avionics. The SH-2G purchase was completed at NZ$12 million under the $338 million budgeted (excluding GST). The first RNZN SH-2G(NZ) was delivered in mid-2001, and the last was delivered February 2003. The Royal New Zealand Navy (RNZN) operates the type from its two Anzac-class frigates, two s, and the multi-role vessel . They were initially operated by the Naval Support Flight of No. 3 Squadron RNZAF, but now from No. 6 Squadron RNZAF.

In May 2012, Defence Minister Jonathan Coleman announced that Cabinet had given Defence officials approval to negotiate with Kaman Corporation for the 11 helicopters and flight simulator from the canceled Australian SH-2G(A) Super Seasprite project. It is thought the 11 helicopters, worth NZ$1.4 billion in 2008, would cost New Zealand between NZ$130 million to NZ$230 million. A decision to purchase ten of the helicopters for $NZ242 million was announced on 19 April 2013. Eight of the aircraft will enter service with the RNZAF to replace the existing five Seasprites, and the remaining two will be used as a source of spare parts.

The New Zealand Ministry of Defence accepted the first of the helicopters in the United States on 1 December 2014, and two more were delivered to Auckland in early 2015. Deliveries were completed by the end of 2015. All the aircraft were in service by 2016. The NZDF's five SH-2G(NZ) Seasprites were officially retired on 14 April 2016, and conducted their last flight on 21 April after serving since August 2001.  They were replaced with eight re-manufactured SH-2G(I) models, allowing the Navy to embark up to three helicopters from ships at once instead of two.  The "I" model also replaces the AGM-65 Maverick with the AGM-119 Penguin anti-ship missile.

New Zealand's five SH-2G(NZ) models were sold to the Peruvian Navy in October 2014 and replaced by the eight SH-2G(I) models.

Peru

Four ex-New Zealand SH-2Gs were re-manufactured and upgraded by Kaman before they were introduced to service with the Peruvian Navy. The "implementation phase" of Peru's Seasprite purchase concluded in 2018. The helicopters will be operated from the Navy's s.

Poland

The Polish Navy operates four of these aircraft, which were included in the purchase of two s from the United States Navy. In 2007 they were modified to carry one MU90 Impact torpedo and a 7.62 mm PK machine gun on pivot mounting.

United States
Beginning in 1991, the US Navy received 24 SH-2Gs, which were assigned to US Navy Reserve units. The Super Seasprite entered service with HSL-84 in 1993. The SH-2 served in some 600 Navy deployments and flew 1.5 million flight hours. The Navy Reserve retired the last of the helicopters by June 2001.

Variants
YSH-2G
SH-2G prototype.
SH-2G Super Seasprite
Anti-submarine warfare helicopter, powered by two 1,723-shp (1,285-kW) General Electric T700-GE-401 turboshaft engines.
SH-2G(A)
Export version for Australia, upgraded former US Navy SH-2F.
SH-2G(E)
Export version for Egypt, upgraded former US Navy SH-2F.
SH-2G(M)
Proposed export version for Malaysia.
SH-2G(NZ)
Export version for New Zealand. Sold to Peru.
SH-2G(I)
Redesignated SH-2G(A) sold to New Zealand.

Operators

Egyptian Navy 10 SH-2G(E)  

Royal New Zealand Navy 8 SH-2G(I) 

Peruvian Navy 5 SH-2G(NZ)

Polish Navy 4 SH-2G

Former operators

Royal Australian Navy 

United States Navy

Aircraft on display

 161642 – SH-2G on static display at the Patuxent River Naval Air Museum in Lexington Park, Maryland.
 162576 – SH-2G on static display at the Wings of Freedom Aviation Museum in Willow Grove, Pennsylvania.

Specifications (SH-2G)

See also

References
Notes

Bibliography

Andrade, John M. U.S. Military Aircraft Designations and Serials since 1909. Midland Counties Publications, England, 1979. .
Eden, Paul. "Kaman SH-2 Seasprite", Encyclopedia of Modern Military Aircraft. Amber Books, 2004. .
Frawley, Gerard The International Directiory of Military Aircraft, Aerospace Publications Pty Ltd, 2002. .

External links

Kaman SH-2G Super Seasprite page (manufacturer)

SH-2 Seasprite on Globalsecurity.org
List of all SH-2 helicopters used by Polish Air Force
Kaman SH-2 Seasprite on Kiwi Aircraft Images site
Seasprite Central

Anti-submarine helicopters
Kaman H-2 Seasprite
Kaman H-2 Seasprite
1980s United States helicopters
Twin-turbine helicopters
Aircraft first flown in 1985
SH-2G Super Seasprite